The 1973–74 Montenegrin Republic League was the 29th season of Montenegrin Republic League. Season started in August 1973 and finished in June 1974.

Season 

Second time in two years, a number of participants is expanded, so on season 1973–74, in Montenegrin Republic League played 16 teams. Among the teams which didn't play on previous season were Lovćen, Jedinstvo and Rudar (relegated from Yugoslav Second League) and three best teams from Regional leagues - Orjen, Mladost Lješkopolje and Tekstilac.
After 30 weeks, the title won Lovćen, with 11 points more than second and third-placed Jedinstvo and Zeta.

Table

Higher leagues 
On season 1973–74, four Montenegrin teams played in higher leagues of SFR Yugoslavia. All of them (Sutjeska, Budućnost, OFK Titograd and Bokelj) participated in 1973–74 Yugoslav Second League.

See also 
 Montenegrin Republic League
Montenegrin Republic Cup (1947–2006)
Montenegrin clubs in Yugoslav football competitions (1946–2006)
Montenegrin Football Championship (1922–1940)

References 

Montenegrin Republic League